Mykolas Majauskas (born 19 December 1981) is a Lithuanian politician, a member of the Seimas, a former Vilnius city councillor and an accused sex offender. He was expelled from Homeland Union in November 2022.

Biography
Mykolas Majauskas was born 19 December 1981 in Vilnius and raised there. After the first course of study in Lithuania, he moved to Australia, where he  graduated from the University of Sydney in 2004 with a bachelor's degree in economics and finance. He later moved to London, where he worked for Barclays Bank advising governments of Central and Eastern Europe on how to manage their debts during the crisis.

He later worked as advisor to the prime minister Andrius Kubilius for four years.

Between 2013 and 2014 he was shadow minister of finance of Homeland Union.

In 2015, he participated in the elections of Lithuanian municipal councils and ran for the Mayor of Vilnius.

In November 2016 Majauskas became a Member of the Seimas for Senamiestis constituency.

Sexual violence allegations, #MeToo
While cultivating a public image of a family man and a fighter against domestic violence, in 2018 Majauskas was accused by a schoolgirl (aged 18 at the time) of making sexual advances in his apartment after plying her with copious amounts of alcohol at a bar (a date rape). She mentioned knowing at least four other schoolgirls who have been attacked by Majauskas in the same way. Allegations were corroborated by a victim who waived her right to privacy and was publicly named; she described a pattern, extending over at least five years, of Majauskas hosting alcohol-fueled house parties with schoolgirls. The name of the woman who first came forward with the allegations has never been publicly disclosed by the media due to fears of retaliation; Majauskas survived two impeachment attempts in the Lithuanian Parliament, thus allegations did not go to court and Majauskas never admitted guilt, however he was shortly divorced by his wife and mother of their 2 daughters. He was also accused of intimidating the victims.  Shortly after the divorce he announced engagement to a woman 12 years his junior, a former personal assistant. They have a son together. 

During the unfolding scandal, Majauskas paused his membership of the party.

The scandal was one of the first ones to galvanize Lithuania's Me Too movement. Following the scandal Majauskas did not resign from his parliamentary seat, continued his political career and remains  a catalyst for the Lithuanian chapter of WEF Global Shapers.

Bribery allegations
In December 2022 it was alleged within a parliamentary corruption inquiry that Majauskas was paid the "cash equivalent of a two-room apartment" for supporting legislation favoring a chain of gambling parlors. Matas Maldeikis, a fellow MP, officially testified he was told so by the middleman during his own attempted €50,000 bribery on behalf of the same beneficiary in June 2021.

Majauskas survived his 3rd impeachment attempt in December 2022, this time due to absence of a quorum.

References

External links
 https://www.vrk.lt/2020-sei/kandidatai?srcUrl=/rinkimai/1104/rnk1424/kandidatai/lrsKandidatasBiografija_rkndId-2419449.html

1981 births
Living people
Homeland Union politicians
Lithuanian politicians
Members of the Seimas
21st-century Lithuanian politicians